The 2019 FIBA Basketball World Cup includes teams whose rosters consists of 12 players; a team may opt to have one naturalized player as per FIBA eligibility rules in their roster. 

Player ages are as of 31 August 2019, the first day of the tournament.

Group A

China

Ivory Coast

Poland

Venezuela
The final roster was announced on 27 August 2019.

Group B

Argentina
The Argentinian team announced the 12-player final roster on 7th of August.

Nigeria
The final roster was announced on 27 August 2019.

Russia

South Korea
The final roster was announced on 31 July 2019.

Group C

Iran
The final roster was announced on 23 August 2019.

Puerto Rico

Spain
The final roster was announced on 21 August 2019.

Tunisia
The final roster was announced on 18 August 2019.

Group D

Angola
The final roster was announced on 7 of August.

Italy

The final roster was announced on 29 August 2019.

Philippines

The final roster was announced on 25 August.

Serbia

The final roster was announced on 29 August 2019.

Group E

Czech Republic
A 12-player roster.

Japan
The Japanese team announced the 12-player final roster on 27th of August.

Turkey

United States

The American team announced the 12-player final roster on 24th of August.

Group F

Brazil
The final roster was announced on 18 August 2019.

Greece
The final roster was announced on 30 August 2019.

Montenegro
Final roster

New Zealand
The final roster was announced on 21 August 2019.

Group G

Dominican Republic
Final roster for the 2019 FIBA Basketball World Cup.

France
The final roster was announced on 27 August 2019.

Germany
Official 2019 World Cup Roster

Jordan
Latest Roster

Group H

Australia
The final roster was announced on 7 August 2019.

Canada
A 12-player final roster was named on 30 August.

Lithuania
The final roster was announced on 27 August.

Senegal
The final roster was announced on 16 August 2019.

Statistics

Player representation by league system
League systems with 15 or more players represented are listed. In all, World Cup squad members play for clubs in 37 countries.

 a  As the Euroleague is a multinational league and all competing teams (excluding Olympiacos) compete in their domestic leagues, the total percentage will be over 100 because of duplications. 
 b  The VTB United League is Russia's main system but teams from neighbouring nations are invited to enter.

 The Chinese, Russian, South Korean and American squads are made up entirely of players from the country's domestic league.
 The Ivorian squad has the most players from a single foreign federation, with nine players employed in France.
 Of the countries not represented by a national team at the World Cup, Israel's league provides the most squad members.
 Three squads (Canada, Senegal and Serbia) are made up entirely of players employed by overseas clubs.

Player representation by club
Clubs with 6 or more players represented are listed.

References

External links

Basketball Team Names 2019

Squads
FIBA Basketball World Cup squads